The second series of Dani's Castle aired from 14 November 2013 to 3 October 2014 on the CBBC Channel. The series mainly focuses on Bogmoor Castle other than Dani fitting in since Dani has moved on as a Hollywood Star. But Bogmoor Castle is still her home so she keeps in touch with the gang via webcam. The series stars Dani Harmer as Dani, Kieran Alleyne as Jimmy, Niall Wright as Gabe, Shannon Flynn as Kait, Jordan Brown as Esme, and introduces newcomers Toby Murray as Dylan and Richard Wisker as Rich.

Cast

Main Cast
 Richard Wisker as Rich
 Shannon Flynn as Kait
 Niall Wright as Gabe
 Kieran Alleyne as Jimmy
 Jordan Brown as Esme
 Toby Murray as Dylan
 Dani Harmer as Dani

Supporting Cast
 Dani Harmer as Dani
 Richard Wisker as Diego
 Shannon Flynn as Roxy

Episodes

References

2013 British television seasons
2014 British television seasons
series 2